Limestone Gap was an unincorporated community in Atoka County, Oklahoma, United States. The town is now abandoned. A type of limestone is named after the site on Limestone Creek. 

A post office was established at Limestone Gap, Indian Territory on March 29, 1875; it closed on February 28, 1922. From September 22, 1897 to July 15, 1901 the name of the post office was Limestone. The area is now known as Gap.

At the time of its founding, Limestone Gap was located in Atoka County, Choctaw Nation.

Gravestones in a cemetery there had deaths dating from 1886 to 1940. Charles LeFlore, a deputy US marshal, who served as captain of the Indian Police, had a ranch there.

References 

Unincorporated communities in Atoka County, Oklahoma
Unincorporated communities in Oklahoma